Pigritia medeocris is a moth in the family Blastobasidae. It was described by Thomas de Grey, 6th Baron Walsingham, in 1897. It is found in the West Indies.

References

Natural History Museum Lepidoptera generic names catalog

Blastobasidae
Moths described in 1897